This article is a list of diseases of elms (Ulmus spp.).

Bacterial diseases

Fungal diseases

Miscellaneous diseases and disorders

Nematodes, parasitic

Virus and Phytoplasma diseases

References
Common Names of Diseases, The American Phytopathological Society

Elm
Tree diseases
Ulmus